Pocillopora grandis, is a colonial species of stony coral in the family Pocilloporidae. It is known commonly as antler coral, and is found in the Indo-West Pacific to the Eastern Tropical Pacific.

Distribution
This species is distributed in the Red Sea and the Gulf of Aden. Further distribution includes: the southwest and northeastern Indian Ocean, the central Indo-Pacific, tropical Australia, southern Japan and the South China Sea, the oceanic West Pacific, the central Pacific, the Hawaiian Islands and Johnston Atoll, the Far Eastern Pacific.  In the Eastern Tropical Pacific region it is also found off the coasts of Mexico, Costa Rica, Panama, Colombia and Ecuador.

References

Pocilloporidae
Cnidarians of the Indian Ocean
Cnidarians of the Pacific Ocean
Taxa named by James Dwight Dana
Corals described in 1846